Rots is a commune in the Calvados department in the Normandy region in northwestern France. On 1 January 2016, the former communes Lasson and Secqueville-en-Bessin were merged into Rots.

Population

See also
Communes of the Calvados department

References

External links

Official site

Communes of Calvados (department)
Calvados communes articles needing translation from French Wikipedia